Yclept is an archaic English word meaning "by the name of".

Yclept may also refer to 

Yclept, album by the band Dome
 Yclept, the first band of musician Chris Jay
 Yclept Yarbro, a newsletter by the writer Chelsea Quinn Yarbro